Roedad Khan (Urdu: روئیداد خان; born 28 September 1923) is a Pakistani politician and former civil servant. He was a leading figure in Pakistan from the start to the end of the Cold War. During his long career, Khan was one of the most senior civil servants of Pakistan.

Early life and career
Khan was born on 28 September 1923, in a small village of Mardan, North-West Frontier Province, British India, to an ethnic Pashtun family that belonged to Yousufzai tribe. In 1939, he graduated from local high school and went to attend Forman Christian College and gained BA in English Literature in 1942. The atmosphere, in the College was liberal, tolerant and progressive. Respecting his father's wishes, Khan attended the Aligarh Muslim University and gained MA in English history in 1946. Upon his return to Mardan, Khan taught history at Islamia College, Peshawar and opted Pakistan's citizenship in 1947. In 1949, Khan joined the elite Pakistan Administrative Service formerly known as District Management Group of the Central Superior Services and started his career in 1951. He started his career in 1951 as the Secretary of Chief Minister of Sindh Provincial Government.

During his long career, Khan served with five Presidents of Pakistan and three Prime ministers of Pakistan. However, his career was at peak when he served with Chief Martial Law Administrator of Pakistan General Muhammad Zia-ul-Haq, responsible for the country's internal security while intelligence efforts were built up to sabotage Soviet military intervention in Afghanistan Soviet Republic. Khan, a part of General's Zia policy to enhance the secret establishment, Khan served as its elite member. After fall of communism, Khan officially retired from Pakistan's politics and civil services and went on to become a political analyst as of current.

He went on to become the Secretary General of Pakistan, the highest rank in Pakistani bureaucracy (could only be achieved after retirement if you had served in BPS-22 grade, position not in place anymore). Roedad Khan had held major public offices during the regime of President General Muhammad Zia ul Haq and President Ghulam Ishaq Khan. Before being appointed as the Secretary General, he held the position of Interior Secretary of Pakistan. He is also author of three books.

Civil Services of Pakistan 
Roedad Khan joined the Civil Services of Pakistan in 1949 and has held several appointments, including those of Chief Secretary Sindh, Chief Secretary Khyber Pakhtunkhwa, managing director Pakistan Television Corporation (PTV), Information Secretary of Pakistan, Secretary Ministry of Labour, Secretary Ministry of Tourism, Interior Secretary of Pakistan, Secretary General Ministry of Interior, Federal Minister of Accountability and Adviser to the Prime Minister of Pakistan and the President of Pakistan.

Length of career
Roedad Khan has worked with five Presidents of Pakistan – Ayub Khan, General Yahya Khan, Fazal Ilahi Chaudhry, General Zia-ul-Haq and Ghulam Ishaq Khan.

References

Pakistani diplomats
Pashtun people
Pakistani civil servants
Pakistani political commentators
1923 births
Living people
Military government of Pakistan (1977–1988)
Forman Christian College alumni
Pakistan Tehreek-e-Insaf politicians
People from Mardan District